Terra Boa (Portuguese meaning the "good land") is a remote village in the northern part of the island of Sal, Cape Verde. In 2010 its population was 131. The village is about 4 km north of the island capital Espargos.

References

Villages and settlements in Sal, Cape Verde